Thierry Gouvenou (born 14 May 1969) is a French former professional racing cyclist. He rode in seven editions of the Tour de France and one each of the Vuelta a España and the Giro d'Italia.

Since 2014, Gouvenou has worked as a lead course designer of the Tour de France.

Career achievements

Major results

1990
 1st Paris–Roubaix Espoirs
1991
 9th Omloop Het Volk
1992
 10th Overall Étoile de Bessèges
1993
 10th Omloop Het Volk
1994
 10th Kuurne–Brussels–Kuurne
1995
 3rd GP de Denain
1997
 7th Overall Tour de Normandie
1998
 3rd Overall Tour de Normandie
1st Stage 4
1999
 3rd Overall Tour de Normandie
 10th GP de la Ville de Rennes
2001
 10th Tro-Bro Léon
2002
 3rd Polynormande
 7th Paris–Roubaix
 10th Paris–Camembert

Grand Tour general classification results timeline

References

External links
 

1969 births
Living people
French male cyclists
People from Vire
Sportspeople from Calvados (department)
Cyclists from Normandy